Gashaka-Gumti National Park (GGNP) is a national park in Nigeria, It was gazetted from two game reserves in 1991 and is Nigeria’s largest national park. It is located in the eastern provinces of Taraba and Adamawa to the border with Cameroon. The total area covers about 6,402 km2, much of the northern GGNP is savannah grassland, while the southern GGNP sector of the park has a rugged terrain characterized by very mountainous, steep slopes as well as deep valleys and gorges, and is home to montane forests. It is an important water catchment area for the Benue River. There is abundant river flow even during the markedly dry season. Enclaves for local Fulani pastoralists exist within the park boundary that allow for farming and grazing.

Fauna

The fauna of the national park is very diverse. 103 species of mammals have been recorded at censuses. Species include yellow-backed duiker, African golden cat (Profelis aurata), The African buffalo, the largest population in Nigeria of chimpanzee (Pan troglodytes) is found within the boundaries of the national park. To protect the animals and the ecosystem, the Gashaka Primate Project was launched. Living in the national park are also the African elephant (Loxodonta africana), the klipspringer (Oreotragus oreotragus), the West African wild dog (Lycaon pictus manguensis), the hartebeest (Alcelaphus buselaphus), the world's largest antelope, the giant eland (Taurotragus Derbianus), the roan antelope (Hippotragus equinus), the kob antelope (Kobus kob), the oribi (Ourebia ourebi), and the rare Adamawa mountain reedbuck (Redunca fulvorufula) in larger stocks.

The avian fauna is very rich and diverse, there are stocks are up 1 million birds estimated. The park is officially labelled as one of Africa's "Important Bird Areas" - and with more than 500 species found, and visiting bird watching enthusiasts are constantly adding new species to the list. The red faced lovebird is only found here and in the Central African Republic's Bamingui-Bangoran National Park and Biosphere Reserve .

Flora
In November 2002 an isolated population of the red sunbird bush, an ornate species of the acanthus family, was discovered in the 8 km2 Leinde Fadale forest in the uplands adjacent to the park. The species occurs here at 1,600 to 1,670 m.a.s.l., and some 1,200 km from the nearest populations in the Afromontane archipelago. It has been suggested that the park boundary should be extended to protect the forest.

References

World Heritage Sites in Nigeria
National parks of Nigeria
Taraba State
Protected areas established in 1991
1991 establishments in Nigeria
Northern Congolian forest–savanna mosaic